The 1994 Big West Conference men's basketball tournament was held March 10–13 at the Thomas & Mack Center in Paradise, Nevada. This was the first Big West/PCAA tournament played outside the state of California.

Top-seeded  defeated UC Irvine (the tournament's lowest-seeded team, with only 4 conference wins) in the final, 70–64, to capture their second PCAA/Big West title.

The Aggies subsequently received an automatic bid to the 1994 NCAA tournament.

Format
For the second straight year, there were changes to the tournament format.

The Big West returned to a ten-team tournament with all conference members in participation. With all teams seeded and paired based on conference regular-season records, the top six teams were given byes into the quarterfinal round while the four lowest-seeded teams were placed in a preliminary first round. 

As a result of the field's expansion, this was the first tournament for second-year Big West member Nevada.

Bracket

References

Big West Conference men's basketball tournament
Tournament
Big West Conference men's basketball tournament
Big West Conference men's basketball tournament
Basketball competitions in the Las Vegas Valley
College basketball tournaments in Nevada